XOV may refer to:

XOV or eXperimental Orbital Vehicle of Blackstar spacecraft, reported codename of a secret United States orbital spaceplane system 
XOV (musician), Swedish singer-songwriter, of Iranian origin